"Crystal Love" is the third single by melody. under the Toy's Factory label released November 27, 2003. The single stayed on the Oricon for 11 weeks and peaked at number 34. To date, the single has sold 16,889 copies.

Track listing
 Crystal Love (5:27)
 Do You Hear What I Hear? (3:19)
 Crystal Love: m&M Remix (4:54)
Crystal Love: Instrumental (5:27)
Do You Hear What I Hear? Instrumental (3:19)

Melody (Japanese singer) songs
2003 singles
2003 songs
Toy's Factory singles